Hoff the Record is a British television comedy show starring David Hasselhoff, which was screened on Dave in June 2015. It follows a mockumentary fly-on-the-wall format with David Hasselhoff playing a fictionalised version of himself in the autumn of his career, relocating to the UK to seek new opportunities. A second series was commissioned by Dave and began airing on 6 May 2016.

Cast

Series overview

Episodes
A total of twelve episodes across two series were produced and broadcast.

Series 1 (2015)

Series 2 (2016)

Home media
The first six episodes plus deleted scenes were released in a single-disc DVD set on 30 November 2015.

The series streamed on Netflix in the United States between 2017 and 2022.

References

External links

2010s British comedy television series
2015 British television series debuts
2016 British television series endings
Dave (TV channel) original programming
English-language television shows
David Hasselhoff